Kloostrimetsa (Estonian for "Convent Forest") is a subdistrict in the district of Pirita, Tallinn, the capital of Estonia. It's located north of the Pirita River and is mostly covered by the park forest Kloostrimets (Cloister Forest, which name comes from the nearby Pirita monastery). Kloostrimetsa has a population of 80.

Tallinn Botanic Garden, Tallinn TV Tower, Metsakalmistu cemetery and Pirita-Kose-Kloostrimetsa Circuit are located in Kloostrimetsa.

Gallery

References

Subdistricts of Tallinn